Dalel Singh was the king of Karnpura during the 17th century. He shifted his capital from Badam in Barkagaon, which is now in Hazaribagh district, to Ramgarh in 1670 and family has used Ramgarh in official and other work after changing their capitals to other place.

He built a huge palace for protection from the Mughal Empire. He shifted his capital from Badam  to Ramgarh for protection from Mughal invasion. He had built famous Kaitha Shiv Mandir dedicated to Lord Shiva in Kaitha, Ramgarh. Temple has been declared as National Monument in 2016. He was also a poet and wrote a book named Shiv Sagar. 

Chero king of Palamu Jaikishan Rai and Dalel Singh captured the Tori which was in possession of Nagvanshi. Jaikishan Rai attacked Ramgarh as Dalel Singh gave shelter to Ranjit Rai. Dalel Singh died in battle. Then a descendant of Dalel Singh invaded and captured Palamu.

References

Year of birth missing
1724 deaths
17th-century Indian monarchs
Jharkhand
17th century in India
Mughal Empire people
Nagpuri-language writers